Ernest Rubondo is a Ugandan geologist and business executive. He is the executive director of the Petroleum Authority of Uganda.

Background and education
He was born in the Western Region of Uganda. He holds a Master of Science in Petroleum Reservoir Geology awarded by the Imperial College London in 1990.

Career
Following his studies in London, he worked briefly with Scott Pickford Plc in the United Kingdom. He returned to Uganda and began to work at the Uganda Ministry of Energy, Oil and Mineral Development. He is a member of the Uganda government team that promotes the country's petroleum potential to industry and also negotiates production sharing agreements with oil companies for acreage in the Albertine Graben. From 2008 until 2014, he served as commissioner for petroleum exploration and production department. He then served as director for petroleum in the Ministry of Energy, Oil and Mineral Development.

In 2015, when the government of Uganda created the Directorate of Petroleum in the Energy ministry, Rubondo was appointed its acting director. In June 2016, he was named executive director of Uganda's Petroleum Authority.

See also
Uganda Oil Refinery
Uganda National Oil Company
Holder of an MSc in Petroleum Reservoir Geology at the Imperial College of Science, Technology and Medicine in London in 1990 and worked briefly with   Scott Pickford Plc in the United Kingdom.  Returned to Uganda to participate in field data acquisition as part of the petroleum      exploration effort in the country. Held the position of Commissioner for the Petroleum Exploration and Production Department (PEPD) between 2008 – 2014 and that of Director for Petroleum from November 2014 to August 2016, both in the Ministry of Energy and Mineral Development, Uganda.  Mr. Rubondo is a member of the Uganda Government team that promoted the country’s oil and gas potential to industry with a view to attract investment in the sector, and a participant in the negotiations for Petroleum Production Sharing Agreements between Government and oil companies. He	Chaired the working group which formulated the draft National Oil and Gas Policy for Uganda which was approved in 2008 and coordinated preparation of petroleum bills which were subsequently enacted into petroleum legislation in 2013. Led the description of national content in Uganda’s oil and gas sector, commenced its implementation and continues to oversee its regulation.  He also led the country’s technical team, which assessed the suitability and selection of the pipeline route for exporting Uganda’s crude oil during 2016. He was appointed to lead the country’s newly created Petroleum Authority of Uganda starting September 2016.  He led and coordinated Government of Uganda’s effort to negotiate and conclude the agreements required by the licensed oil companies to take Final Investment Decisions for the country’s oil and gas projects between 2019 - 2021.  The Final Investment Decision was subsequently announced on 1st February 2022.

Mr. Rubondo is a member of the American Association of Petroleum Geologist (AAPG), and the Geological Society of Uganda. He is also member of the Uganda Section of the International Society of Petroleum Engineers and chaired its Board for 2019.  He was recognized in 2006 for his contribution to the discovery of oil in Uganda by H.E the President of the Republic of Uganda.  He is also a recipient of the Global Pacific Award for Distinguished Contribution to the African Oil and Gas Industry, 2007. He was awarded the Nalubale medal in recognition of the contributions towards the development of Uganda’s oil and gas sector in 2016.

References

External links
Uganda to invest US$20b into oil

Living people
Western Region, Uganda
Ugandan geologists
Alumni of Imperial College London
1951 births